Rocafuerte Fútbol Club is a football club based in Guayaquil, Ecuador. They play in the Serie B, the second level of professional football in Ecuador.

Current squad

Achievements
Campeonato de Segunda
Winner (1): 2008

Women's section
The women's football section of Rocafuerte plays in the Ecuadoran league. It has won the national club title in 2013 and 2014. In the 2013 Copa Libertadores Femenina, the continental club championship, they finished third in their group.

References

Football clubs in Ecuador
Association football clubs established in 1994
1994 establishments in Ecuador